August Prinzhofer (12 September 1816 in St. Veit an der Glan – 4 August 1885 in Bad Steinerhof bei Kapfenberg) was an Austrian painter and lithographer.

Life
August Prinzhofer came from a long-established Carinthian family and showed great talent for drawing even as a child. He studied law in Vienna and Padua. He worked in a civil court in Vienna from 1844 onwards as well as a simultaneous and successful career as a portraitist, until in 1854 he gave up the law to devote himself entirely to portraiture.

Prinzhofer was one of the artists who led to the flowering of photolithography in Vienna from 1830 to 1860 - others included Joseph Kriehuber, Franz Eybl and Eduard Kaiser. His lithographs included more than 500 portraits (of subjects including Hector Berlioz, Ludwig von Benedek, Ignaz Franz Castelli, Archduke John of Austria, Lajos Kossuth, Albert Lortzing,  Alois Negrelli, pope Pius IX, Johann Ladislaus Pyrker and Johann Nestroy). In the 1850s photography was becoming ever more widespread and in 1860 the photolithograph fell out of fashion, so in 1861 Prinzhofer moved to Graz and increasingly dedicated himself solely to oil-on-canvas portraits and watercolour miniatures.

Bibliography
  G. Gsodam: Prinzhofer August. In: Österreichisches Biographisches Lexikon 1815–1950 (ÖBL). Volume 8, Verlag der Österreichischen Akademie der Wissenschaften, Wien 1983, S. 284.
  Gottfried Rittershausen, August Prinzhofer, Walter Krieg Verlag, 1962
  August Prinzhofer. In: Ulrich Thieme, Felix Becker etc. : Allgemeines Lexikon der Bildenden Künstler von der Antike bis zur Gegenwart. Volume 27, E. A. Seemann, Leipzig 1933, S. 406f
  Prinzhofer August In Constantin von Wurzbach: Biographisches Lexikon des Kaisertums Österreich, 23. Volume,S. 311, Wien 1872

External links 

1816 births
1885 deaths
19th-century Austrian painters
Austrian male painters
Austrian lithographers
Austrian watercolourists
Portrait miniaturists
Austrian portrait painters
People from Sankt Veit an der Glan
19th-century Austrian male artists